Sherman House is a historic home located at Glens Falls, Warren County, New York.  It is a large pink brick building with a profusely bracketed roof and octagonal cupola.  It consists of a -story rectangular block to which has been added four porches and three wings.  It is thought to date to the 1840s.  The front verandah and rear wing date to about 1900 when it was occupied by the Bemis Eye Sanitarium.

It was added to the National Register of Historic Places in 1977.

See also
 National Register of Historic Places listings in Warren County, New York

References

Houses on the National Register of Historic Places in New York (state)
Houses in Warren County, New York
Glens Falls, New York
National Register of Historic Places in Warren County, New York